Grierson is a surname of Scottish origin. The name is possibly a patronymic form of the personal name Grier or Grere, which may have reflected the Scots pronunciation of Gregor. The earliest known spellings are Grersoun and Greresoun.
It was common practice in SW Scotland, particularly in the 16th and 17th centuries, for the name to be abbreviated to Grier, and there are many instances of the two forms being used in reference to the same man in the same document. This usage was further modified to Greer by a cadet branch of the Lag family who migrated to Ireland.

People surnamed Grierson
 Alister Grierson (born 1969), Australian film director
 Benjamin Grierson (1826–1911), American Army General
 Cecilia Grierson (1859–1934), Argentine physician and activist
 Colin McKay Grierson (born 1906), Royal Air Force Air Commodore
 Constantia Grierson (1705–1732), Irish author
 Darrell Philip Grierson (born 1968), English footballer
 David Grierson (1955–2004), Canadian CBC radio host
 Derek Grierson (1931–2011), Scottish football player
 Don Grierson (geneticist), British geneticist
 Don Grierson (ice hockey) (born 1947), Canadian professional hockey player
 Edgar Grierson (1884–1959), British Labour Party politician 
 Edmund Grierson (1860–1922), Canadian municipal politician
 Edward Grierson (1914–1975), British barrister and writer
 Francis Grierson (1848–1927), English born American author
 George Grierson (1867–1931), Canadian politician
 George Grierson (printer) (c. 1678 – 1753), Scottish-born printer in Dublin
 George Abraham Grierson (1851–1941), Irish orientalist, linguist and civil servant
 Henry Grierson (1891–1972), English cricketer, barrister and author,
 Herbert John Clifford Grierson (1866–1960), Scottish literary critic
 James Grierson (British Army officer) (1859–1914), British Army Lieutenant General
 James Grierson (minister, born 1791) (1791–1875), Scottish Moderator of the General Assembly to the Free Church of Scotland
 Jasmine Grierson (born 1998). Australian rules footballer 
 John Grierson (1898–1972), Scottish born Canadian film-maker
 John Grierson (pilot), (1909–1977), British pilot and author
 John Grierson (Dominican), or Grisson (died 1564?), Scottish Dominican principal of the King's College 
 Margaret Storrs Grierson (1900–1997), American philosophy professor and archivist of the Sophia Smith Collection 
 Mary Grierson (1912–2012), Welsh-born Scottish botanical artist and illustrator
 Murray Grierson, Scottish rally driver
 Philip Grierson (1910–2006), British historian and numismatist
 Robert Grierson (1657–1733), Scottish baronet, 1st Baronet of Lag, Nova Scotia Baronet
Robert Grierson (missionary) (1868–1965), Canadian Presbyterian minister
 Roger Grierson (born 1957), New Zealand musician and executive
 Sir Ronald Grierson (1921–2014), British banker, businessman, government advisor, and British Army officer
 Ruby Grierson (1903–1940), Scottish documentary film-maker
 Sharon Grierson (born 1951), Australian politician
 Sir William Grierson, 2nd Baronet (–1760), Scottish Jacobite, MP for Dumfriesshire 1709–1711
 Trevor Grierson (1849–1913), New Zealand cricketer
 William Grierson (engineer) (1863–1935), British civil engineer on the Great Western Railway, president of the Institution of Civil Engineers 1929–30

People named Grierson
 Robert Grierson Combe (1880–1917), Scottish born Canadian, Canadian Expeditionary Force Lieutenant awarded the Victoria Cross

Other
 Simpson Grierson, a New Zealand law firm
 Clan Grierson, a Lowlands Scottish Clan
 Grierson Baronets, a dormant title in the Baronetage of Nova Scotia

See also
 Grier, a surname

Notes